The 2012 Kuurne–Brussels–Kuurne took place on 26 February 2012. The last escapees were caught by the peloton shortly after the 10 kilometers to go banner.

Results

References

Kuurne–Brussels–Kuurne
Kuurne
Kuurne